Coos County is the name of two counties in the United States:

 Coös County, New Hampshire 
 Coos County, Oregon